Sturge Island is one of the three main islands in the uninhabited Balleny Islands group located in the Southern Ocean. The island, in Oates Land, also forms part of the Ross Dependency, claimed by New Zealand.

Description
The island is roughly a parallelogram in shape, with long east and west coasts and shorter coasts facing north-west and south-east. It is mostly covered by ice and snow throughout the year. The island's highest point reaches  with the unclimbed stratovolcano Brown Peak, the highest point in the Balleny chain.

Discovery and naming
The Balleny Islands were discovered by British mariner John Balleny in 1839. Sturge Island was named after Thomas Sturge, one of the London merchants who had financed Balleny's expedition.

Important Bird Area
A 4,655 ha site on the island has been designated an Important Bird Area (IBA) by BirdLife International because it supports extensive breeding colonies of southern fulmars and snow petrels on ice free cliffs along the western and northern coasts.

See also 
 Cape Frances
 Composite Antarctic Gazetteer
 Antarctic Treaty
 List of Antarctic and Subantarctic islands
 Thomas Sturge

References

 

Important Bird Areas of Antarctica
Seabird colonies
Islands of the Balleny Islands